Wilden is a village and civil parish located in the Borough of Bedford in Bedfordshire, England. The population of 399 in the 2011 Census was estimated at 392 in 2019.

Heritage
John Marius Wilson's Imperial Gazetteer of England and Wales describes Wilden as it was in 1870–1872:

"WILDEN, a parish in the district and county of Bedford; 5 miles NE of Bedford r[ailway] station. It has a post-office under Bedford. Acres, 2,160. Real property, £2,765. Pop[ulation], 501. Houses, 112. The property is subdivided. The living is a rectory in the diocese of Ely. Value, £400.* Patron, Mrs. Chalk. The church is good; and there are an Independent chapel, an endowed school with £47 a year, and charities £26."

Famous person
The scholar and Bible translator Francis Dillingham died in Wilden in 1625.

Amenities
The village has a 14th–15th century Grade I listed Anglican church dedicated to St Nicholas. There is a Baptist Chapel in Great Barford Road, with Sunday services held there three times a month. The chapel was probably founded in 1806, although its old Church Book has been lost.

Wilden Primary School is a Voluntary Aided Church of England school. It recently had 59 pupils, and a pre-school section for 10. It dates back to the 17th century and was rebuilt in the 19th. Additions were made in 1972, 1993, 2004 and 2013. It serves as a lower school within a group of schools called St Albans Cluster.

There are five Grade II listed buildings in the village. The single pub is called the Victoria Arms, but it is currently closed. There is also a village hall available for local activities.

Wilden is served by a daytime bus service: Grant Palmer No. 27S between Bedford and Ravensden. It runs four times a day on Monday to Saturday.

References

External links

Wilden Lower School
Wilden village hall

Villages in Bedfordshire
Civil parishes in Bedfordshire
Borough of Bedford